Lee Ya-hsuan and Kotomi Takahata were the defending champions, but Lee chose not to participate. Takahata partnered Erika Sema, but lost in the first round to Han Xinyun and Jessica Moore.

Lu Jingjing and You Xiaodi won the title after defeating Guo Hanyu and Ye Qiuyu 7–6(7–2), 4–6, [10–5] in the final.

Seeds

Draw

References
 Main Draw

Dalian Women's Tennis Open - Doubles
2017